Royal Cavalcade, also known as Regal Cavalcade, is a 1935 British, black-and-white, drama film directed by six separate directors: Thomas Bentley (Supervising Director), Herbert Brenon, Norman Lee, Walter Summers, W. P. Kellino and Marcel Varnel. The film features Marie Lohr, Hermione Baddeley, Owen Nares, Robert Hale, Austin Trevor, James Carew, Edward Chapman and Ronald Shiner as the Soldier in Trenches. The film was presented by Associated British Pictures Corporation.

Synopsis
The film portrays a dramatised pastiche of great events that occurred during the reign of George V. It was made to mark the twenty fifth anniversary of his succession to the throne.

Cast

References

External links
 
 
 

1935 films
1935 drama films
British black-and-white films
1930s English-language films
Films directed by Thomas Bentley
Films directed by Herbert Brenon
Films directed by Norman Lee
Films directed by Walter Summers
Films directed by W. P. Kellino
Films directed by Marcel Varnel
Films set in the 1910s
Films set in the 1920s
Films set in the 1930s
British drama films
Films shot at British International Pictures Studios
Films set in London
1930s British films